Jerome Charles Minor Jr. (born October 4, 1969) is an American actor, comedian and writer known for his comedic roles in numerous television programs such as Mr. Show, Saturday Night Live, Trigger Happy TV, Delocated, Brickleberry, Unbreakable Kimmy Schmidt, Crossballs, The Hotwives of Orlando, Carpoolers, Community, Lucky Louie, and Dr. Ken.

Life and career
Minor was born in Memphis, Tennessee and grew up in Flint, Michigan. Minor was raised as a Jehovah's Witness during most of his youth. Later in life, after rejecting his Jehovah's Witness upbringing, Minor was shunned by some members of his family. He began doing stand-up comedy and writing/performing with sketch comedy groups in Detroit before eventually joining the Second City Detroit's mainstage improv troupe. After writing and performing in three revues, he joined the Second City Chicago for two shows and then one revue at the Second City Toronto. At the time he was the only performer to have belonged to all three of the Second City's touring companies.

Minor was hired as a cast member and writer on Saturday Night Live for one season in 2000–2001. He was let go from the show over the summer hiatus, before the start of the 2001–2002 season, because Lorne Michaels wanted to hire four new cast members, but did not want to go over budget. Minor's best known work at SNL included the recurring sketch Rap Street (which he performed with Horatio Sanz) and his appearances on Weekend Update as Al Sharpton.

In addition to SNL, Minor has appeared regularly on a number of other sketch comedy programs, including HBO's Mr. Show, where he was a cast member during its final season. He was briefly a correspondent on The Daily Show in early 2000, had a recurring role as Officer Carter on Arrested Development and was one of the main cast members of Comedy Central's debate show parody Crossballs in 2004. He worked briefly as a writer and occasional performer on the short-lived FOX sketch series Cedric the Entertainer Presents.

In 2006, Minor was part of the main cast of the HBO series Lucky Louie, on which he played Louis C.K.'s neighbor, Walter. Minor was praised for his Lucky Louie role in a 2006 issue of TV Guide, where he was given a "Cheers" in the magazine's Cheers and Jeers section. He was part of the cast of the 2008 ABC sitcom Carpoolers, playing the role of Aubrey and was a featured comedian on Lewis Black's Root of All Evil on Comedy Central. Minor has also gained attention online in 2010, for his memorable appearances as "Cyber Thug" on the Comedy Bang Bang podcast, which was briefly spun off into its own podcast titled Cyber Thug Radio on the Earwolf network.

For a number of years Minor and comedian Craig Robinson had a comedy act where they performed as musical duo "L. Witherspoon & Chucky", with Minor as smooth singing "L. Witherspoon" and Robinson as "Chucky", the keyboard player and back-up singer. They performed the act on several stand-up shows on Comedy Central as well as on Real Time with Bill Maher and Jimmy Kimmel Live!.

Minor has appeared in films such as I Love You, Man, Drillbit Taylor and Beer League, and had a small part in the 2003 movie Melvin Goes to Dinner directed by Bob Odenkirk.

Minor has made guest appearances on shows such as Curb Your Enthusiasm, Funny or Die Presents, Drunk History, The League, Nick Swardson's Pretend Time, Key & Peele, Jon Benjamin Has a Van, Last Man Standing, How I Met Your Mother, and Brooklyn Nine-Nine. In 2010, he co-starred as "Mighty Joe Jon the Black Blonde" in the second season of the Adult Swim series Delocated. Minor has also had recurring appearances on comedy programs such as The Office as Brandon, Eastbound & Down as Jamie Laing, Community as Jerry the Janitor, The Hotwives as Rodney, Unbreakable Kimmy Schmidt as Chris, and in the animated series Bob's Burgers as the voice of Officer Julia. He also co-starred as the voice of Denzel in the Comedy Central animated series Brickleberry.

Minor is now the co-host of The Cult Awareness Podcast that discusses Scientology, Jehovah's Witnesses, and other subjects.

He stars as the lead in the satirical musical For the Love of a Glove, which portrays Michael Jackson's glove as a sentient being and the true cause of his many misfortunes.

Characters on SNL
Grand Master Rap, co-host of the old-school rap music program Rap Street on BET.
Terrell, the catty and effeminate security guard who works with conceited deskclerk Jackie (Maya Rudolph)
Willy Sluggs, a magician who performs less-than-spectacular magic tricks on his show Willy Sluggs' Eye Poppers

Celebrity impressions
Cuba Gooding Jr. (on SNL)
Jimi Hendrix (on SNL)
Al Sharpton (on SNL)
Miss Cleo (on SNL - cut sketch)
Nipsey Russell (on SNL - cut sketch: shown in 2001 SNL Halloween Special)
Puff Daddy (on VH1 Divas Live Aretha Franklin special)
Billy Dee Williams (on Mr. Show DVD audio commentary')
Bill Cosby (on Lucky Louie)
Ja Rule (on Jimmy Kimmel Live!)
Chris Tucker (on Primetime Glick and The Martin Short Show)
Michael Winslow (on Showtime's The Offensive Show pilot)
Joseph Kony (on PoliPopTV viral video)
Boyd Tinsley (at UCB's The Midnight Show)
Steve Harvey (at UCB's Comedy Death-Ray)
Kanye West (at UCB's Comedy Death-Ray)
Ben Carson (at UCB's Decision Election 2016 All-Star Clusterfuck)

References

External links

Jerry Minor on YouTube
In depth interview from November 12, 2007

1969 births
Living people
African-American male actors
American comedy musicians
American male film actors
American stand-up comedians
American male television actors
American male voice actors
American television writers
American male television writers
Former Jehovah's Witnesses
Writers from Flint, Michigan
Male actors from Memphis, Tennessee
Male actors from Michigan
21st-century American male actors
20th-century American male actors
American sketch comedians
Actors from Flint, Michigan
Screenwriters from Michigan
Screenwriters from Tennessee
20th-century American comedians
21st-century American comedians
20th-century African-American people
21st-century African-American people